Vuelve temprano (English: Don't Be Late), is a Mexican telenovela created by Grupo Imagen Multimedia and Argos Comunicación for Imagen Televisión. It is based on the homonymous telenovela produced by Televisión Nacional de Chile in 2014.

The series is starring Gabriela de la Garza as Clara, Mario Cimarro as Inspector Antonio, Rubén Zamora as Santiago, Sharis Cid as Maité, Francisco de la O as Francisco, Carlos Ferro as Agente Manuel, Sara Corrales as Denisse and Alejandro Durán as Hans.

Plot 
"Vuelve temprano" tells the story of Clara and Santiago, a couple who seems to have the perfect life until everything collapses and they realize that they know their children much less than they believed.

Cast

Main 
 Gabriela de la Garza as Clara Zavaleta
 Mario Cimarro as Inspector Antonio Avelica
 Rubén Zamora as Santiago Urrutia
 Sharis Cid as Maité Soler
 Francisco de la O as Francisco Valenzuela
 Carlos Ferro as Agente Manuel Carvallo
 Sara Corrales as Denisse Moya "Candy"
 Alejandro Durán as Hans Troncoso

Secondary 
 Sophie Gómez as Fiscal Loreto Rodríguez
 Alejandra Ambrosi as Renata Zavaleta
 Alejandro Caso as Miguel
 Cristina Rodlo as Isabel  Urrutia Zavaleta
 Julia Urbini as Florencia Urrutia Zavaleta
 Andrés Delgado as Pablo Valenzuela Soler
 Christian Vázquez as Gabriel Castro
 Estela Calderón as Estrella Herrero
 Daniel Barona as Ignacio Urrutia
 Adriana Lumina as Catalina Garza
 Palmeira Cruz as Ingrid Parra
 Teresa Pavé
 Adriana Leal as Sofía Herrera
 Flor Payán

Episodes

References

External links 
 

2016 telenovelas
Mexican telenovelas
Argos Comunicación telenovelas
2016 Mexican television series debuts
2017 Mexican television series endings
Imagen Televisión telenovelas
Mexican television series based on Chilean television series